The men's 100 metre freestyle at the 2005 World Aquatics Championships occurred on 27 July (heats and semifinals) and in the evening of 28 July (final) in the Olympic pool at Parc Jean-Drapeau in Montreal, Canada. 131 swimmers were entered in the event, of which 124 swam in one of 17 preliminary heats. The top-16 swimmers from the heats advanced on to semifinals; the top-8 swimmers in the two semifinals heats advanced onto the next night's final.

The existing records at the start of the event were:
World record (WR): 47.84, Pieter van den Hoogenband (Netherlands), September 19, 2000 in Sydney, Australia.
Championship record (CR): 48.33, Anthony Ervin (USA), Fukuoka 2001 (Jul.27.2001)

Results

Final

Semifinals

Preliminaries

See also
Swimming at the 2003 World Aquatics Championships – Men's 100 metre freestyle
Swimming at the 2004 Summer Olympics – Men's 100 metre freestyle
Swimming at the 2007 World Aquatics Championships – Men's 100 metre freestyle

References

FINA Worlds 2005: Men's 100 Freestyle heats results from OmegaTiming.com (official timer of the 2005 Worlds). Published 2005-07-27, retrieved 2009-09-03.
FINA Worlds 2005: Men's 100 Freestyle semifinals results from OmegaTiming.com (official timer of the 2005 Worlds). Published 2005-07-27, retrieved 2009-09-03.
FINA Worlds 2005: Men's 100 Freestyle final results from OmegaTiming.com (official timer of the 2005 Worlds). Published 2005-07-28, retrieved 2009-09-03.

Swimming at the 2005 World Aquatics Championships